The unpatterned robust slider (Lerista macropisthopus)  is a species of skink found in Western Australia.

References

Lerista
Reptiles described in 1903
Taxa named by Franz Werner